Lacanobia mongolica is a moth of the Noctuoidea family. It is found in Mongolia, the South Siberian Mountains and the Amur and Primorye regions.

The wingspan is 32–38 mm.

External links
Species info

Lacanobia
Moths described in 1992